Nashville is an unincorporated community in Jackson County, in the U.S. state of Iowa.

Geography

History
 Nashville was founded on the Iowa Midland Railway. By 1910, it had thee general stores, a blacksmith and repair shop, and a church.

Nashville's post office operated from 1871 until 1935. The community was named by an early settler for his native hometown of Nashville, Tennessee. 

Nashville's population was 54 in 1902, and 100 in 1925.

In 1940, Nashville's population was 55.

See also
Cottonville, Iowa

References

Unincorporated communities in Jackson County, Iowa
1871 establishments in Iowa
Populated places established in 1871
Unincorporated communities in Iowa